Dennis O'Neill  (November 22, 1866 – November 15, 1912) was a Major League Baseball player. He played for the St. Louis Browns in June, 1893.

References

External links

1866 births
1912 deaths
19th-century baseball players
Holy Cross Crusaders baseball coaches
Major League Baseball first basemen
St. Louis Browns (NL) players
Baseball players from Massachusetts
Sportspeople from Holyoke, Massachusetts